Freedom Farm Cooperative was an agricultural cooperative in Sunflower County, Mississippi, founded by American civil rights activist Fannie Lou Hamer in 1969 as a rural economic development and political organizing project. With a farm and a pig-raising program as well as an affordable housing development and financing, and a host of supplemental programs, the Freedom Farm Cooperative sought to create the conditions of self-sufficiency for African American farmers that alleviated poverty and remove the economic precarity white landowners used to prevent African American farmers from exercising in the political rights. Hamer founded the project after she was fired and evicted, leaving her penniless, for registering to vote in 1962.

Background
In the Jim Crow era, the United States Department of Agriculture imposed a variety of policies that caused African American farmers to lose farmland as well as systematically rejected their loan applications to buy land. This (among other federal government policies that disadvantaged African Americans) forced many into sharecropping or other low-wage jobs, or to leave the area altogether, moving north or west in search of job opportunities. In the Mississippi Delta where Hamer founded her project, African American farmers lost approximately 12 million acres of land, including six million between 1950 and 1964, shortly before Hamer launched her effort.

Hamer, born in 1917 in Mississippi, grew up in the midst of these conditions. The youngest child of sharecroppers, at age six joined them in the plantation fields picking cotton. She attended school until age 12 when she left to work full time and after she married in 1944, she and her husband also worked on a Mississippi plantation, until 1962. Hamer was the plantation's timekeeper, as its only laborer who knew how to read and write. In 1962, however, she joined the Student Non-Violent Coordinating Committee (SNCC) and in August participated in an action to register to vote. The plantation owner fired her for this; her husband was required to stay through the harvest and then most of their land was taken. The couple moved to Ruleville, Mississippi (in rural Sunflower County) with almost nothing. 

Hamer continued to organize and made notable advances in the political arena—her speech at the 1964 Democratic National Convention that helped lead to the Voting Rights Act of 1965—but saw a simultaneous need for work for economic opportunity as a mode of activism that could foster political freedom. Her own firing and eviction for voting was not an isolated incident and she saw the threat of lost livelihood constraining African American efforts to exercise political rights in the Mississippi Delta. In a magazine interview in 1968, she said: "Where a couple of years ago white people were shooting at Negroes trying to register, now they say, 'go ahead and register—then you'll starve.'"

Founding
As an economic response to the widespread poverty, but also as a political project in response to the white landowners who evicted African American farmers who tried to vote, Hamer began planning the Freedom Farm Cooperative. In 1969 she received a $10,000 contribution from Measure for Measure, a nonprofit in Madison, Wisconsin. This, as well as support from singer and civil rights activist Harry Belafonte, allowed Hamer to buy 40 acres of land for a cooperative farm in Ruleville, where poverty was severe and worsening. The immediate goals of the Freedom Food Cooperative (FFC) were threefold: to improve nutrition, affordable housing and entrepreneurship opportunities for African Americans.

The cooperative structure allowed families to trade work hours for a bushel of the farm's produce. Over 1,500 families participated (although even at one dollar a month, only 30 families could afford to pay dues). They grew cash crops (to pay taxes and other overhead costs of operating the FFC) and vegetables for sustenance, including snap peas, butter beans, squash, peas, and cucumbers. In an era with widespread sharecropping, the cooperative stood as an example of the importance of owning land, something Hamer emphasized: "Land is the key. It's tied to voter registration." Owning land meant owning the food from it, and the political freedom that came with that. 

Hamer also constructed 200 affordable housing units on the FFC land. As of 2020, some of these homes are still standing in Ruleville. More generally, the FFC's financial services helped thousands of families in rural Mississippi buy homes that had heat and running water for the first time. This improved and stabilized housing was a dramatic change in Sunflower county where 90% of African American homes lacked indoor plumbing; and where, in 1969, white owners evicted more than 100 African American sharecropping families from their shacks or tents on the plantation.

In addition to these programs, the FFC also had a Head Start preschool, a commercial kitchen, and a garment factory. The FFC offered assistance to those who lost their jobs or their homes (or both) in retaliation for voting, and gave local tenant and sharecropping farmers access to education as well as job training in healthcare and disaster relief (important as mechanization was eliminating many farming jobs).

Expansion and pig bank
One year into the project, a donation from the National Council of Negro Women (NCNW) allowed Hamer to purchase another 640 acres and launch a pig bank—Hamer felt owning a pig was a bulwark against starvation. When the pigs arrived (five male pigs, which were Jersey boars, and 50 female pigs, which were Yorkshire gilts), the FFC threw a welcome party to celebrate with food, dancing, singing, and handshaking. 

The "Sunflower Pigs" arrived to a breeding barn local women (who were at the time often the more experienced farmers) had built. A loan system was set up whereby families would take a gilt on loan and pay "interest" to the pig bank in the form of piglets. Once the pigs reached the proper weight, the families would butcher them, which gave a family a year's worth of ham and lard and reduced their dependence on purchasing from the plantation commissary. This self-reliance challenged existing power structures, freeing African American farmers otherwise trapped in debt by the sharecropping system. It also fostered political freedom. In addition to white plantation owners like Hamer's former boss who fired African American farmers for voting, politicians like Mississippi congressman Jamie Whitten, who sat on the Agricultural Appropriations Subcommittee, retaliated against the voting rights movement by impeding federal programs that might have sent food aid to African Americans in the Delta. By offering a reliable food source, the FFC removed that lever of coercion. The farm cooperative and pig bank, eliminating food insecurity, meant African American farmers no longer had to risk starvation to vote.

Closing 
While the FFC was succeeding in feeding the community, it was not immediately financially solvent on its own and the lack of strong institutional support began weakening the organization. Organizational disagreements, in some cases, as well as a general economic downturn caused funders to pull out. Meanwhile, a series of floods and droughts in 1972 and 1973 ruined the harvest of cash crops the FFC depended on to make its mortgage payments. Hamer had personally been a major source of income, using her fees as a sought-after national and international speaker to bolster the organization, but by 1974 her health was failing and her travel ceased. The FFC closed in 1976 and Hamer died of breast cancer the following year, at age 59.

References

Agricultural cooperatives in the United States
Former cooperatives of the United States
Sunflower County, Mississippi
History of agriculture in the United States
African-American history of Mississippi
Worker cooperatives of the United States
Civil rights movement